The New Mexico Court of Appeals (in case citation, N.M. Ct. App.) is the intermediate-level appellate court for the state of New Mexico.

History 
The court of appeals was created by a constitutional amendment submitted to the electorate in a special election held on September 28, 1965. The original enabling legislation established a court consisting of four judges. The court was expanded to five judges in 1972 and seven judges in 1978. In 1991, it was again expanded to ten judges, where it remains today.

Jurisdiction
The court has general appellate jurisdiction over the state district courts and certain state agencies. The only exceptions to this grant of jurisdiction are:

criminal cases in which the death penalty or life imprisonment is sought,
Appeals from the Public Regulation Commission, and
Cases involving the writ of habeas corpus.

These cases are directly reviewed by the New Mexico Supreme Court.

Composition
Ten judges sit on the court, each with their own paralegal and law clerk. However, the Court is moving towards a two-law clerk system.

, the court is composed of the following judges:

 Chief Judge Jennifer Attrep (D)
 Judge J. Miles Hanisee (R)
 Judge Kristina Bogardus (D)
 Judge Jacqueline Medina (D)
 Judge Megan Duffy (D)
 Judge Zachary Ives (D)
 Judge Shammara Henderson (D)
 Judge Jane Yohalem (D)
 Judge Gerald Baca (D)
 Judge Katherine Anne Wray (D)

References

External links
Official homepage of the New Mexico Court of Appeals

State appellate courts of the United States
Appeals
1965 establishments in New Mexico
Courts and tribunals established in 1965